Juan Andres "Andy" Donato Bautista is the former chairman of the Commission on Elections (COMELEC) of the Philippines and former dean of the Institute of Law of the Far Eastern University, a private, non-sectarian university in Manila, Philippines.

Bautista is a member of the Consultative Commission on Charter Change, an independent body formed in 2005 by President Gloria Macapagal Arroyo to propose revisions to the 1987 Philippine Constitution.

He is a frequent resource speaker on topics concerning Philippine constitutional law and the state of legal education and profession in the country.

He was once nominated to be the next Chief Justice of the Supreme Court of the Philippines.

Education
Bautista earned his Bachelor of Science in Legal management degree from Ateneo de Manila University in 1986, a Bachelor of Laws (Class Valedictorian) from Ateneo Law School in 1990, and a Master of Laws from Harvard Law School in 1993.

Career
From 2002 to 2005, Bautista became president of the Philippine Association of Law Schools. He was also a bar reviewer in constitutional law at the National Bar Review Consortium (2003–2008), a lecturer in constitutional law and project finance at the Ateneo Law School and the Far Eastern University institute of Law, a trustee of the Philippine Judicial Academy, a member of the Supreme Court Committee on Legal Education and Bar Matters, a member of the governing board of the Mandatory Continuing Legal Education Office, vice president for academic affairs of the Philippine Constitution Association, as well as director and corporate secretary of the British Chamber of Commerce.

Bautista was also the former dean of the FEU Institute of Law and the Master of Business Administration-Juris Doctor dual degree program of the De La Salle Graduate School of Business and Far Eastern University. He is concurrently the chairman of the board of directors of the Makati Shangri-la Plaza Hotel.

While still a law student, Bautista served as judicial clerk to then Chief Justice Marcelo Fernan from 1989 to 1992.

In 2014, he was replaced by Atty. Mel Sta. Maria as FEU Law dean.

Commission on Elections and the 2016 election cheating allegations

In August 2010, Bautista was appointed by President Benigno Aquino III as chairman of the Presidential Commission on Good Government.

On April 28, 2015, President Benigno Aquino III signed Bautista's appointment as the new COMELEC chairman. This appointment played an important role in the 2016 General Elections in the Philippines, where many issues and accusations circulated in the media and online social networks about the apparent manipulation of the election results by the dominant political party at the time, Liberal Party (Philippines).

The camp of losing vice-presidential candidate Bongbong Marcos claimed and presented  reports of irregularities in the hash code of the data provided by the COMELEC's transparency server.  COMELEC explains that this happened as the result of the correction of the character 'Ñ' which did not render properly in the output.

Another accusation claimed by the Marcos camp was the reports of another discrepancy in the data provided by the same transparency server, where the number of votes have been slightly decreased further.  Bautista explained that this occurred as the result of their intentional act of removing the "test votes" which were apparently included in the official vote counts by accident, and reported by the transparency server. Still Marcos supporters believed the massive cheating was done through manipulation of the voting system and that Bautista had a direct hand in it.

In its decision dated December 28, 2016, the National Privacy Commission found the COMELEC guilty of violation of the Data Privacy Act of 2012 for a data breach that led to the leakage of personal data of 1.3 million overseas Filipino voters as well as fingerprints of 15.8 million people and recommended the filing of criminal charges against Bautista under Section 26 of the Act. On March 25, 2021, the Court of Appeals dismissed Bautista's petition for review.

On October 11, 2017, Bautista announced his intention to resign as chairman of the Commission on Elections by the end of the year. Hours after announcing his intent to resign, the House of Representatives voted 137–75–2 to impeach Bautista from the post amid allegations of unexplained wealth. However, as of 2021, no articles of impeachment have reached the Senate. On October 23, President Rodrigo Duterte formally accepted Bautista's resignation.

It was later discovered that Bautista fled to the United States on November 21, 2017, and refused to return to the Philippines despite a subpoena to attend a Senate probe.

International conferences
Bautista has been a reactor in the 18th IDP International Education Conference in Sydney in 2004, a participant in the bilateral discussions with the University of Nepal Faculty of Law in Kathmandu in 2002 (no such university name in Nepal), a reactor in the 21st Century Form of Legal Education in Beijing in 2001, a delegate in the Conference on Obstacles to Third World Development in 1988, and Captain of the Philippine Team in the World University Debating Championships also in 1986.

He was also included in the Pandora Papers as incorporator of Baumann Enterprises Limited, a company registered in the British Virgin Islands in 2010. Baumann has never been declared in Bautista’s Statement of Liabilities, Assets and Net Worth (SALN) from 2010 to 2015.

References

External links
Far Eastern University Institute of Law
La Salle-FEU MBA-JD Dual Degree Program

20th-century Filipino lawyers
21st-century Filipino businesspeople
21st-century Filipino lawyers
Ateneo de Manila University alumni
Benigno Aquino III administration personnel
Chairpersons of the Commission on Elections of the Philippines
Duterte administration personnel
Filipino educators
Filipino people of Spanish descent
Impeached Filipino officials
Harvard Law School alumni
Living people
People named in the Pandora Papers
Recipients of the Presidential Medal of Merit (Philippines)
Year of birth missing (living people)